The 1989 Quebec general election was held on September 25, 1989, to elect members of the National Assembly of the Province of Quebec, Canada. The incumbent Quebec Liberal Party, led by Premier Robert Bourassa, won re-election, defeating the Parti Québécois, led by Jacques Parizeau.

This election was notable for the arrival of the Equality Party, which advocated English-speaking minority rights.  It won four seats, but never had any success in any subsequent election.

Results
The overall results were:

See also
 List of Quebec premiers
 Politics of Quebec
 Timeline of Quebec history
 34th National Assembly of Quebec

External links
 CBC TV video clip
 Results by party (total votes and seats won)
 Results for all ridings

References

Further reading
 

Quebec general election
Elections in Quebec
General election
Quebec general election